BK Häcken will be competing in the following competitions during the 2017 campaign: Allsvenskan and Svenska Cupen

Competitions

Club Friendlies

Allsvenskan

Results summary

Results by matchday

Matches

Svenska Cupen

External links
 BK Häcken – official site
 Supporterklubben Getingarna – official supporter club site
 Sektion G – supporter site

BK Häcken seasons
Häcken